The ISO 10993 set entails a series of standards for evaluating the biocompatibility of medical devices to manage biological risk. These documents were preceded by the Tripartite agreement and is a part of the international harmonisation of the safe use evaluation of medical devices.
For the purpose of the ISO 10993 family of standards, biocompatibility is defined as the "ability of a medical device or material to perform with an appropriate host response in a specific application".

ISO 10993-1:2009 & FDA endpoints for consideration 
The following table provides a framework for the development of a biocompatibility evaluation.  Different biological endpoints may require evaluation for particular medical devices, including either additional or fewer endpoints than indicated. If it is unclear in which category a device falls, consulting device-specific guidances or contacting the appropriate US Food and Drug Administration (FDA) review division for more information is possible. The table "Endpoints to be addressed in a biological risk assessment" was revised by the 2018 edition of ISO 10993-1. The selection of endpoints for the biocompatibility evaluation is determined by the nature of body contact (e.g. implant device) and contact duration (e.g. long term contact of more than 30 days).

List of the standards in the 10993 series
ISO 10993-1:2018	Biological evaluation of medical devices    Part 1: Evaluation and testing within a risk management process
ISO 10993-2:2006	Biological evaluation of medical devices    Part 2: Animal welfare requirements
ISO 10993-3:2014	Biological evaluation of medical devices    Part 3: Tests for genotoxicity, carcinogenicity and reproductive toxicity
ISO 10993-4:2017	Biological evaluation of medical devices    Part 4: Selection of tests for interactions with blood
ISO 10993-5:2009	Biological evaluation of medical devices    Part 5: Tests for in vitro cytotoxicity.
ISO 10993-6:2016	Biological evaluation of medical devices    Part 6: Tests for local effects after implantation
ISO 10993-7:2008	Biological evaluation of medical devices    Part 7: Ethylene oxide sterilization residuals
ISO 10993-8:2001       Biological evaluation of medical devices    Part 8: Selection of reference materials (withdrawn)
ISO 10993-9:2019	Biological evaluation of medical devices    Part 9: Framework for identification and quantification of potential degradation products
ISO 10993-10:2021	Biological evaluation of medical devices    Part 10: Tests for skin sensitization
ISO 10993-11:2017	Biological evaluation of medical devices    Part 11: Tests for systemic toxicity
ISO 10993-12:2021	Biological evaluation of medical devices    Part 12: Sample preparation and reference materials (available in English only)
ISO 10993-13:2010	Biological evaluation of medical devices    Part 13: Identification and quantification of degradation products from polymeric medical devices
ISO 10993-14:2009	Biological evaluation of medical devices    Part 14: Identification and quantification of degradation products from ceramics
ISO 10993-15:2009	Biological evaluation of medical devices    Part 15: Identification and quantification of degradation products from metals and alloys
ISO 10993-16:2018	Biological evaluation of medical devices    Part 16: Toxicokinetic study design for degradation products and leachables
ISO 10993-17:2002	Biological evaluation of medical devices    Part 17: Establishment of allowable limits for leachable substances
ISO 10993-18:2020 	Biological evaluation of medical devices    Part 18: Chemical characterization of medical device materials within a risk management process
ISO/TS 10993-19:2020	Biological evaluation of medical devices    Part 19: Physico-chemical, morphological and topographical characterization of materials
ISO/TS 10993-20:2006	Biological evaluation of medical devices    Part 20: Principles and methods for immunotoxicology testing of medical devices
ISO/TR 10993-22:2017   Biological evaluation of medical devices    Part 22: Guidance on nanomaterials
ISO 10993-23:2021 Biological evaluation of medical devices    Part 23: Tests for irritation
ISO/TR 10993-33:2015 Biological evaluation of medical devices    Part 33: Guidance on tests to evaluate genotoxicity — Supplement to ISO 10993-3

See also
 List of ISO standards
 ISO Standards catalogue: 11.100.20 - Biological evaluation of medical devices

References

10993
Regulation of medical devices
Medical devices